Windy City Live (WCL) is a local daytime talk show that is broadcast on WLS-TV and based in Chicago, Illinois. It premiered on May 26, 2011 as a replacement of The Oprah Winfrey Show which retired that month and is produced by WLS-TV (ABC 7 Chicago). The talk show is filmed in front of a live audience weekdays at the ABC7 Studios in the Chicago Loop on State Street. Current and original hosts are Val Warner and Ryan Chiaverini.

In November 2019, Windy City Live aired its 2,000th live episode with multiple special guests and performances. Windy City Live maintains strong viewership ratings, and has been nominated for and won numerous Chicago Emmy awards.

On July 21, 2021, WLS-TV cancelled Windy City Live. Production was ceased on September 3, 2021.

Concept
Windy City Live combines talk, entertainment, celebrity guest appearances, localized Chicago interests, and more in a 60-minute show. Original co-hosts Val Warner and Ryan Chiaverini are joined by guest contributors Roe Conn, an American talk radio host, and television producer Hank Mendheim. Ji Suk Yi had also served as a contributor and later co-host of the show until her departure for the Chicago Sun-Times in 2018.

In July 2018, Bonnie Hunt, former host of The Bonnie Hunt Show, co-hosted WCL with Chiaverini while Warner was away on vacation.

Segments
'Four-Star Chicagoans' is a segment that features a local Chicagoan making a difference in the community weekly.
'Pillow Talk' is a segment where viewers submit a question online seeking advice on relationships or personal issues and if featured on-air, a prize is offered.
'2 Minute Warning' is a segment hosted by Chiaverini featuring a series of rapid-fire questions intended to trigger humorous responses from well known personalities.

Celebrity appearances
Through the years, celebrity and special guest visits on Windy City Live have included: Anthony Anderson, Chance The Rapper, Dan Abrams, David Muir, Diane Sawyer, Tory Burch, Jenifer Lewis, Valerie Jarrett, LaVar Ball, Masi Oka, G Eazy, Rick Bayless, Garry McCarthy, Shea Couleé, Sinbad, Nick Cannon, Jay Pharoah, Brett Eldredge, Kevin Hart, Mr. T, Michael Pfleger, Carla Hall, Chris Redd, Rahm Emanuel, Pat Quinn, Jennifer Hudson, Brian Urlacher, Martha Stewart, Jimmy Kimmel, Rosie O'Donnell, Martha Wash, and more.

On November 13, 2018, Michelle Obama previewed her newest book, Becoming, in an interview with Warner on the show. The Chicago interview took place the same day her national book tour kicked off at the United Center with Oprah.

Production
The show is filmed in front of a live audience weekdays at 1 p.m. CDT based at ABC7 Studios in downtown Chicago. The running time is between 40–45 minutes per episode. Tickets to participate in the live audience are free of charge and available online first-come, first-served. Matt Knutson has been the executive producer since 2015.

The Windy City Live set was once home of The Oprah Winfrey Show until 1988, before it moved to Harpo Studios in West Loop, Chicago. Following the end of Oprah in 2011, Windy City Live initially replaced the 9 a.m. CDT time slot in Chicago on WLS-TV.

Reception
Windy City Live is currently in its tenth season. Early ratings peaked at viewership of over 105,000 Chicago households per episode. In recent years, viewership has remained steady with strong ratings among women 25 to 54.

The talk show's social media presence remains strong with over 344,000 Facebook and 38,000 Twitter followers. Its YouTube channel has nearly 32,000 subscribers with videos highlighting Chicago food, celebrity impressions, and highlights from daily episodes.

In 2016, Windy City Live won a Chicago/Midwest Emmy in the program category of best interview/discussion. The following year, Ryan Chiaverini won a Chicago/Midwest Emmy award for best Program Host/Moderator in his role on the series. It is the talk show's fifth Emmy award overall.

References

External links
 
 

Chicago television shows
First-run syndicated television programs in the United States
2011 American television series debuts
2021 American television series endings